Francisco Jiménez may refer to:

Francisco Jiménez (equestrian) (1893-1973), Spanish Olympic equestrian
Francisco Jiménez (governor), colonial Nahua noble from Tecamachalco
Francisco Jiménez (writer), Mexican American writer, and professor at Santa Clara University
Francisco Jiménez de Cisneros (1436–1517)
Xisco (footballer, born 1986), full name, Francisco Jiménez Tejada
Édgar Francisco Jiménez (born 1951), Colombian artist
Francisco Jiménez Merino (born 1959), Mexican IRP politician
Francisco Herrera Jiménez (born 1965), Mexican IRP politician
Francisco Manuel Vélez Jiménez
Francisco Nicasio Jiménez, Cuban orchestra conductor and dance band director
Francisco Orozco y Jiménez (1864–1936), Mexican Roman Catholic archbishop

See also
Jiménez (disambiguation)